Candy Land (also Candyland) is a simple racing board game published by Hasbro. The game requires no reading and minimal counting skills, making it suitable for young children. No strategy is involved as players are never required to make choices; only following directions is required. About one million copies per year are sold.

Gameplay
The race is woven around a storyline about finding King Kandy, the lost king of Candy Land. The board consists of a winding, linear track made of 134 spaces, most red, green, blue, yellow, orange, or purple. The remaining pink spaces are named locations, such as Candy Cane Forest and Gumdrop Mountain, or characters, such as Queen Frostine and Gramma Nutt.

Players take turns removing the top card from a stack, most of which show one of six colors, and then moving their marker ahead to the next space of that color. Some cards have two marks of a color, in which case the player moves the marker ahead to the second-next space of that color. The deck has one card for each named location, and drawing such a card moves a player directly to that board location. This move can be either forward or backward in the classic game; backward moves can be ignored for younger players in the 2004 version of the game.

Prior to the 2006 edition, the board had three colored spaces marked with a dot.  Two of these spaces were designated as "cherry pitfalls" and the other was situated in Molasses Swamp.  A player who lands on such a space is stuck (all cards are ignored until a card is drawn of the same color as the square). In the 2006 version, dot spaces were replaced with licorice spaces that cause the player landing on it simply to lose the next turn.

The game is won by landing on or passing the final square and thus reaching the goal of the Candy Castle. In the original version, that final square is purple, but the official rules specify that any card that would cause the player to advance past the last square wins the game.  Many people, however, play with a rule that one must land exactly on the last square to win. The 2004 version changed the last space to rainbow color, meaning it applies to any color drawn by a player, which renders the rule moot.

, Candy Land is being sold by Hasbro with a spinner instead of cards.  The spinner includes all outcomes that were previously on the cards.

History
The game was designed in 1948 by Eleanor Abbott, while she was recovering from polio in San Diego, California. The game was made for and tested by the children in the same wards on the hospital. The children suggested that Abbott submit the game to Milton Bradley Company. The game was bought by Milton Bradley and first published in 1949 as a temporary fill-in for their then main product line, school supplies. Candy Land became Milton Bradley's best-selling game, surpassing its previous top seller, Uncle Wiggily, and put the company in the same league as its main competitor, Parker Brothers. The original art has been purported to be by Abbott, although this is uncertain.

In 1984, Hasbro purchased Milton Bradley. Landmark Entertainment Group revamped the game with new art, adding characters and a story line in 1984.

Hasbro produces several versions of the game and treats it as a brand.  For example, it markets Candy Land puzzles, a travel version, a personal computer game, and a handheld electronic version.

Candy Land was involved in one of the first disputes over Internet domain names in 1996. An adult web content provider registered candyland.com, and Hasbro objected.  Hasbro obtained an injunction against the use.

In 2012, Hasbro announced a film, which triggered a lawsuit by Landmark Entertainment Group over ownership and royalties owed for the characters and storyline introduced in the 1984 edition.

Reception
The Toy Industry Association named Candy Land as the most popular toy in the US for the 1940s. In 2005, the game was inducted into the National Toy Hall of Fame at The Strong Museum in Rochester, New York. About one million copies per year are sold.

Versions

At least four versions of the Candy Land board game were made. The first dates from 1949. This version, and other early versions, had only locations (Molasses Swamp, Gumdrop Mountains, etc.) and no characters. A board copyrighted in 1962 shows a track layout different from the more recent versions.

In the first edition, the pawns were wooden, but they were changed in the 1967 version to plastic gingerbread men.

The 1984 edition introduced a storyline and characters such as Mr. Mint and Gramma Nutt. It has the modern track layout and ends with a purple square.

Some of the characters and place names were changed in 2002. Queen Frostine became "Princess" Frostine, the classic Molasses Swamp was changed to Chocolate Swamp, Princess Lolly was changed to Lolly, and the character Plumpy was removed entirely.

A VCR board game version was released in 1986. Hasbro released an electronic version of the game for Windows in 1998. An animated 2005 feature, Candy Land: The Great Lollipop Adventure, was produced and later spawned a DVD game version of Candy Land.

The "Give Kids the World: Village edition" of Candy Land was produced by Hasbro especially for the Give Kids The World Village, a non-profit resort in Kissimmee, Florida for children with life-threatening illnesses and their families. Traditional Candy Land characters and locations were replaced with the venues and characters of the Village, such as Mayor Clayton and Ms. Merry.

There are licensed versions of Candy Land with characters such as Winnie the Pooh, Dora the Explorer, and SpongeBob.

Characters
Characters depend on the version of the game.
 The Kids – In the classic version, they are two blonde twins. In 2002, there are four kids of varying races. In the 2013 edition, they are a marshmallow, an ice cream cone, a gumdrop, and a gingerbread girl.
 Mr. Mint – He lives in the Candycane Forest, and is a candy cane "woodcutter". He was removed from World of Sweets and then brought back for the 2013 version as an ice skater instead of a woodcutter. 
 Duke of Swirl – Mr. Mint's replacement in the 2010 edition.
 Gramma Nutt – Gramma Nutt lives in a peanut brittle house on the corner of Candy Land. Renamed Nana in the 2014 edition.
Bazz- the dog and official pet of Gramma Nutt in the 2002 edition.
 King Kandy – the king of Candy Land. He lives in a castle made of sweets.
 Jolly – A happy chubby monster representing gumdrops. He was removed in the 2010 version and then after widespread outcry and demand was brought back for the 2013 edition; however, he was once again removed in the 2014 edition.
 Plumpy – A fuzzy green monster under the gingerbread plum tree. He was removed in the 2002 version and replaced by Mamma Ginger Tree.
 Mamma Ginger Tree – Makes the best gingersnaps in all of Candy Land. She was removed from the game.
 Cupcake Commons – Mamma Ginger Tree's replacement in the 2010 version.
 Princess Lolly – She was renamed 'Lolly' after the 2002 edition and later renamed Princess Lolly in the 2010 and 2014 editions.
 Queen Frostine – She was renamed 'Princess Frostine' in the 2002 edition.
 Lord Licorice – He is the villain of Candy Land. He rules the Licorice Castle in classic games, the Licorice Forest in 2002, and the Licorice Lagoon in 2014.
Spidora- one of Lord Licorice's pets. She is a small red spider with eight legs, black stripes, and yellow eyes.
Buzzy- Another one of Lord Licorice's pets. He is a brown vulture with gray eyes, a yellow beak and feet, a copper belly, and a pink head.
Crockett- Lord Licorice's third pet. He is a green crocodile with yellow eyes and a lime spine.
 Gloppy – Friendly monster made of chocolate (originally made of molasses)
Gingerbread Kids- Young gingerbread people seen in various editions of Candyland, usually as the player's pieces.
Jib- Gingerbread Boy Jib is the main character and protagonist of Candy Land: The Great Lollipop Adventure, but does not appear in the games.
Ginga Ninja- an unknown character and child of Mama Ginger Tree.
Grandma Gooey- Gramma Nutt's replacement in the 2010 edition. Along with Gloppy, she and he are, obviously, both residents of Chocolate Mountain. She is somewhat of an expert when it comes to making cakes.
Fluffypuffer- a plump character that appears in the VCR board game. Whenever its name is said aloud, it multiplies.

Legacy

Motif
The Candy section of Toys "R" Us in New York City's Times Square maintained a Candy Land theme until losing its license for the characters in 2006. The theme included a colored pathway that mimicked the board for the game, several Candy Land characters, and candy-themed shelving and ceiling decorations.

Comic book 
Candy Land was one of several Hasbro properties featured in the 2011 one-shot comic book Unit: E, which attempted to revamp and tie together several of Hasbro's dormant properties. Princess Lolly is seen in one page, with Synergy (from Jem), the son of Acroyear and his servant Biotron (both from Micronauts) discussing her and other fairies that have crossed over from their land onto Earth more than once. Synergy believes the creatures of Primordia (an attempted reworking of Inhumanoids) may have been the result of someone angering the fairies in the past, though she admits she's uncertain if this is in fact the case.

Film adaptation
An animated 2005 feature, Candy Land: The Great Lollipop Adventure, was produced. It was dedicated to Eleanor Abbott, creator of the game, who died before the film came out.

Planned
In February 2009, Universal Pictures announced plans for a film based on the Candy Land board game. Etan Cohen, a writer for comedies Madagascar: Escape 2 Africa and Tropic Thunder, was hired to write the screenplay. Kevin Lima, who directed Enchanted, was set to direct. However, in 2011, a new screenwriting team was designated, composed of Jonathan Aibel and Glenn Berger. They said, "We don't see it as a movie based on a board game, although it has characters from that world and takes the idea of people finding themselves in a world that happens to be made entirely of candy where there are huge battles going on. We are going for real comedy, real action, and real emotions at stake."

By January 2012 Columbia Pictures, Happy Madison, and Adam Sandler were in final negotiations to develop the film, with Sandler both starring and co-writing the screenplay with Robert Smigel. In July 2014, a lawsuit by Landmark Entertainment Group took place over ownership and royalties owned for the characters and storyline introduced in the 1984 edition.

Television adaptation
A cooking competition show, which was based on the game and hosted by Kristin Chenoweth, premiered on Food Network on November 15, 2020. Teams of dessert chefs competed over six weeks for a $25,000 grand prize.

References

External links
 
 Official rules of classic version
 Information about Candyland from the Elliott Avedon Museum & Archive of Games
 Mathematical analysis of 1–4 player game; feature a picture of the classic board
 Deeper mathematical analysis of 1 player game
 Monte Carlo analysis of Candyland, Cootie, and Chutes and Ladders; results for Candy Land differ slightly from others
 Mathematical analysis of Candyland

Board games introduced in 1949
Children's board games
Milton Bradley Company games
Race games
Roll-and-move board games
Candy